Eucalyptus nubila, commonly known as the blue-leaved ironbark, is a type of ironbark tree found in eastern Australia,  in Queensland and New South Wales. This plant is in family Myrtaceae.

References

Myrtales of Australia
nubila
Flora of New South Wales
Flora of Queensland
Drought-tolerant trees